Parmotrema perlatum, commonly known as black stone flower, is a species of lichen used as a spice in India. The species occurs throughout the temperate Northern and Southern Hemispheres. Typically used in meat dishes like nihari (paaya), Bombay biryani, and goat meat stews, it is also used in vegetarian dishes. 

In its raw state, black stone flower does not have much taste or fragrance. However, when put in contact with heat, especially hot cooking oil or ghee, it releases a distinctive earthy, smoky flavour and aroma. This property of black stone flower is especially valued in the tempering step of cooking a number of Indian dishes.

See also
List of Parmotrema species

References

perlatum
Lichen species
Lichens described in 1762
Lichens of Asia
Spices
Indian cuisine
Indian spices
Taxa named by William Hudson (botanist)